This is a list of women's road cycling races. The list only includes the most important women's road races, and no track, mountain or cyclo-cross races.

Championships
 UCI Road World Championships: road race, time trial, team time trial
 African Cycling Championships: road race, time trial
 Asian Cycling Championships: road race, time trial
 European Road Championships (U23): road race, time trial
 Oceanian Cycling Championships: road race, time trial
 Pan American Championships: road race, time trial
 National Championships: road race, time trial

UCI Women's WorldTour
This series replaced the UCI Women's Road World Cup in 2016. Unlike its predecessor, it also features stage races.

Current WorldTour races

Historical overview of World Cup races (1998–2015)

One-day races (below WorldTour)

Current races

Non-UCI races
Netherlands
 Acht van Chaam, professional criterium
 Draai van de Kaai, professional criterium
 Gouden Pijl, professional criterium
 Grand Prix Leende, part of the Dutch National Time Trial competition (Dutch: KNWU tijdritcompetitie)
 Omloop van Borsele Time Trial, part of the Dutch National Time Trial competition (Dutch: KNWU tijdritcompetitie)
 Parel van de Veluwe
 Profronde van Almelo, professional criterium
 Profronde van Oostvoorne, professional criterium
 Profronde van Stiphout, professional criterium
 Profronde van Tiel, professional criterium

Defunct races

(year is last edition)
Women's Challenge  (2002)
Tour of Chongming Island Time Trial  (2009)

Stage races (below WorldTour)

Current races

Defunct races

(year is last edition)
Tour du Grand Montréal  (2009)
La Grande Boucle Féminine  (2009)
Tour de Snowy  (2002)
Tour de l'Aude Cycliste Féminin (2010)
RaboSter Zeeuwsche Eilanden (Cat. 2.2) (2012)

References

 
Events
Bicycle
Road bicycle races